That Sinking Feeling is a 1979 Scottish comedy film written and directed by Bill Forsyth, his first film as a director. The film is set in his home city of Glasgow (the Calton, Bridgeton and Parkhead areas) in Scotland. The young actors in film were members of the Glasgow Youth Theatre. The film also features Richard Demarco, the Edinburgh gallery owner, playing himself. The four main actors went on to feature in Forsyth's following film Gregory's Girl.

Plot
Ronnie (Robert Buchanan), Wal (Billy Greenlees), Andy (John Gordon Sinclair) and Vic (John Hughes) are four bored, unemployed teenagers from Glasgow. One day, Ronnie comes up with the idea of stealing stainless steel sinks from a warehouse and selling them. Their plan involves dressing up as girls and using a strong tranquiliser ('stop-motion potion') on the driver of a bread van (Morton's Rolls).

During the robbery they encounter a ninja style thief (John Gordon Sinclair) who asks to join them. They steal 74 sinks but do not manage to sell many. Richard Demarco buys four in a pile as an artwork at the bargain price of £200.

They still have many to sell, still in the back of the bread van, when they accidentally take an identical van and end with a load of doughnuts. Meanwhile the heavily tranquilised van driver ends up in hospital, and it is thought he will awake in 2068.

Cast

Production
Forsyth said "I couldn't actually afford real actors, and I certainly hadn't had any experience working with them. So I asked the teenagers at a Glasgow community centre if they would appear in my movie at no pay. Actually, I promised them points in the film (a percentage of any profits)."

Locations
Filming took place on location around the city of Glasgow; scenes featured locations such as Kelvingrove Park, Dennistoun, Springburn and Bishopbriggs railway stations, Cowcaddens, Sighthill, Whiteinch and Woodside.

Dubbed soundtrack
The film was released in the United States four years after the United Kingdom, following the success of Gregory's Girl and Local Hero. For the American market, (Metro-Goldwyn-Mayer) the soundtrack was re-dubbed using more mainstream accents from Edinburgh. The MGM version cost more to re-dub than the entire budget for the film itself.

Reception
In 1987 Forsyth said the film earned $90,000, "and we still haven't seen any profit from it."

Philip French, writing in The Guardian, described the premiere of That Sinking Feeling as "Among the happiest surprises of my years as a movie critic", writing that the arrival of the film marked Bill Forsyth as a "major new talent".

Vincent Canby, in The New York Times wrote that "That Sinking Feeling doesn't have quite the panache of Gregory's Girl and Local Hero" but nonetheless praised it as "amiable", "funny" and "gentle".

A review in Empire gave That Sinking Feeling four stars out of five, calling it "funnier, meaner and less wistful than [Forsyth's] subsequent successes".

DVD release
In September 2009, a restored copy of the film was re-released on DVD by 2 Entertain. This has generated controversy however due to the use of the re-dubbed soundtrack, which had the effect of impinging upon the delivery of the dialogue and character of the film.

The British Film Institute, through their Flipside arm, released the film on DVD and Blu-ray on 21 April 2014, with the original Glaswegian dialogue track restored. This release also featured an audio commentary by Bill Forsyth and critic Mark Kermode, as well as other short films Forsyth was involved with.

References

External links
 
 

1979 films
1979 comedy films
Scottish comedy films
British heist films
British teen comedy films
1980s English-language films
English-language Scottish films
Films directed by Bill Forsyth
Films set in Glasgow
Films shot in Glasgow
Bridgeton–Calton–Dalmarnock
1979 directorial debut films
1970s English-language films
1970s British films